The 1999 Notre Dame Fighting Irish football team represented the University of Notre Dame in the 1999 NCAA Division I-A football season. The team was coached by Bob Davie and played its home games at Notre Dame Stadium in South Bend, Indiana.

Season overview
The 1999 season began on a positive note for Davie, who, after signing 21 recruits, was given a contract extension to coach until 2003. Though there were high hopes that the Irish could finally get another national championship, there were also many questions facing the team, top among those would be whether Jackson could lead a young Irish team. With some controversy surrounding a verbal agreement between Notre Dame and Michigan to not schedule a game before their September 4 matchup, the Irish instead opened the season in the Eddie Robinson Classic against Kansas. Though Jackson didn't answer all the questions in the game (throwing three interceptions), the Irish still dominated the Jayhawks in the 48–13 win. With the Irish ranked 16th they went next to face the seventh-ranked Wolverines. Watched by a, then NCAA record, crowd of 111,523, the Wolverines took the lead late in the game on an Anthony Thomas touchdown run. With under two minutes remaining, Jackson led the Irish down the field with three quick passes, however, the time ran out as he completed his fourth of the drive. Though the Irish lost, 26–22, they would remain at 16th in the national polls until stumbling against Purdue the next week. With Davie blaming poor communication on the loss, the Irish dropped from the rankings for the first time in two years.

With a 10-game home winning streak, the Irish hoped to get back on track with a win against Michigan State. With the game tied 7–7 starting the fourth quarter, it looked to be headed for another last-minute decision, however, with five minutes left in the game, with the score tied again at 13–13, Spartans quarterback Bill Burke threw a quick pass to Gari Scott who ran for an 80-yard touchdown. Though the Irish had a chance and drove to the 50-yard line, Davie elected to punt the ball on fourth down with three minutes left in the game. The Spartans added a field goal to put them up 23–13 and win the game. After a week off, the Irish faced the 23rd-ranked Oklahoma Sooners. Down 30–14 mid-way through the third quarter, Jackson led the Irish on two scoring drives to bring them within two points. With the ball at their own 2-yard line, Jackson led a 98-yard drive that gave the Irish the winning touchdown. The Irish continued at home, blowing out Arizona State, coming from behind by 21 points to defeat USC, and scoring a last minute touchdown to beat Navy, to move back into the rankings.

For the first time since September the Irish would go on the road. Facing the fourth-ranked Tennessee Volunteers, the Irish knew they were in for a tough test as Tennessee, the reigning winners of the inaugural BCS National Championship, had not lost a non-conference home game since the 1990 Irish team won there. Against the tough Volunteer defense, the Irish were only able to score 14 in the 24 point loss, and once again dropped from the rankings. With a loss to Pittsburgh in the final game at Pitt Stadium, and a last second loss on a failed two-point conversion against Boston College, the Irish lost all chances to go to a bowl game with a 5–6 record. Hoping to avoid their first losing season since 1986, they traveled to Stanford to face the Cardinal. With Jackson splitting time with Arnaz Battle, the Irish come from behind bid failed on a last second field goal by Stanford.

Though the season was a disappointment, Jackson, a fifth-year senior, ended his career with the Irish on a high note. Named the team's Most Valuable Player, he set the single-season records in passing yards, total yards, pass attempts, and completions. He also left with the fourth-most passing yards in Irish history. Jackson was drafted in the seventh round of the 2000 NFL Draft, and, although he was the only player from the team drafted, nine others signed free agent contracts with NFL teams. The year ended on a bad note for the Irish program, as the NCAA placed the program on probation for two years after a number of major secondary violations by the university and others involved in athletics. Then-university president Rev. Edward Malloy disbanded all varsity booster clubs, the first time any university took such actions, and put into place other safeguards against violations, pledging his administration would give a greater effort to stop any future violations.

Schedule

Rankings

Game summaries

Oklahoma

Roster

References

Notre Dame
Notre Dame Fighting Irish football seasons
Notre Dame Fighting Irish football